Sherifuria haningtoni is a species of short-horned grasshopper in the family Acrididae. It is found in West Africa.

In Mali, it is common in rocky areas, and is considered to be a pest that eats grasses and grains.

References

External links
 Names in Dogon languages, with images from Mali

Acrididae
Insects described in 1926
Orthoptera of Africa